The Adiong Memoral State College or (AMSC), formerly known as Adiong Memorial Polytechnic State College is a public college in the Philippines.  It is mandated to provide higher professional, technical and special instructions for special purposes and promote research and extension services and advanced studies in agriculture, forestry, ecology, and other allied courses.  Its main campus is located in Ditsaan-Ramain, Lanao del Sur (a suburb of Marawi).

References

State universities and colleges in the Philippines
Universities and colleges in Lanao del Sur
Philippine Association of State Universities and Colleges